Hugh Wilson "Bones" Taylor (July 6, 1923 – November 1, 1992) was an American football player and coach.  He played as an end in the National Football League (NFL) for the Washington Redskins.  Taylor attended Tulane University at the start of World War II where he was a Navy V-12 student.  At Tulane he was an All-Southeastern Conference and All-American basketball player in 1943. After being discharged from the U.S. Navy in 1946, he played college football at Oklahoma City College before entering the NFL in 1947.  In his first NFL game, he gained 212 yards receiving, setting league records for an NFL debut and first game of the season.  Those records were broken by Anquan Boldin in 2003 and Frank Clarke in 1962, respectively.  As a member of the Redskins from 1947 to 1954, the 6-foot-4-inch Taylor made the Pro Bowl in 1952 and 1954.

Following his playing career, Taylor coached in the college and professional ranks.  After two seasons as an assistant at Florida State University, he served as the head football coach at Arkansas State College—now known as Arkansas State University from 1958 to 1959, compiling a record of 7–11.  While at Arkansas State, he was initiated into the Sigma Pi fraternity chapter there.  Taylor then moved to the American Football League (AFL), as an assistant coach with the New York Titans from 1960 to 1962 and with the San Diego Chargers in 1963.  He was an assistant for the Houston Oilers for one season before succeeding Sammy Baugh as head coach in 1965.  The Oilers went 4–10 in 1965, resulting in Taylor's dismissal at the end of the season.  Taylor coached receivers for the Pittsburgh Steelers of the NFL from 1966 to 1968.  In 1969, he coached the Spokane Shockers of the Continental Football League.  The Shockers were owned by Taylor's former Redskins teammate, Ed Justice.  With the Shockers Taylor coached Ken Stabler, a rookie quarterback late signed by the Oakland Raiders.

Taylor died on November 1, 1992.

Head coaching record

College

NFL

References

External links
 
 

1923 births
1992 deaths
American football ends
Arkansas State Red Wolves football coaches
Continental Football League coaches
Florida State Seminoles football coaches
Houston Oilers coaches
New York Jets coaches
Oklahoma City Stars men's basketball players
Oklahoma City Chiefs football players
Pittsburgh Steelers coaches
San Diego Chargers coaches
Tulane Green Wave men's basketball players
Washington Redskins players
Eastern Conference Pro Bowl players
People from Wynne, Arkansas
Players of American football from Arkansas
United States Navy personnel of World War II
American men's basketball players
Houston Oilers head coaches